Isabel Strauss [Strauß] (1928–1973) was a German operatic soprano.  She appeared in Munich, Bern, Amsterdam, and Brussels, as well as singing Gutrune in Wieland Wagner's 1963 production of Götterdämmerung, in Cologne.  Also in 1963, she portrayed Marta in a film of Tiefland.

In 1964, Strauss was seen on French television in a Concert Version of excerpts from Parsifal (as Kundry), with Wolfgang Windgassen, conducted by Georges Sébastian.  The following year, she was seen over the same network in excerpts from Lohengrin (as Ortrud), with Windgassen and Elisabeth Grümmer.

Following a 1973 performance of Götterdämmerung, she was a victim of a double-suicide, with the conductor Fritz Janota, in a forest near Bern.

Discography 
 d'Albert: Tiefland (Schock; Zanotelli, 1963) Eurodisc
 Berg: Wozzeck (Berry; Boulez, 1966) Sony

References 
 Liner notes to Sony recording of Wozzeck.

External links 
  Isabel Strauß in an excerpt from Tiefland (1963).

1928 births
1973 suicides
German operatic sopranos
20th-century German  women opera singers
Joint suicides
Suicides in Germany